Ying Zhenshan (born 1 October 1956) is a Chinese biathlete. He competed in the 20 km individual event at the 1980 Winter Olympics.

References

1956 births
Living people
Chinese male biathletes
Olympic biathletes of China
Biathletes at the 1980 Winter Olympics
Place of birth missing (living people)